The 1988 Milwaukee Brewers season involved the Brewers finishing 3rd in the American League East with a record of 87 wins and 75 losses.

Offseason
 November 11, 1987: Bryan Clutterbuck was signed as a free agent with the Milwaukee Brewers. 
 November 11, 1987: Bill Mooneyham was signed as a free agent by the Brewers.
January 19, 1988: Ronn Reynolds was signed as a free agent with the Milwaukee Brewers.

Regular season
 April 4, 1988: The largest margin of victory in a shutout win on Opening Day was the Brewers' 12-0 win over the Baltimore Orioles in 1988.
 April 19, 1988: The Orioles tied the 1904 Washington Senators and the 1920 Detroit Tigers for most losses to start the season with 13 losses after being beaten by the Brewers, 9-5, in Milwaukee.
 April 20, 1988: On a cold, wet night, 7,284 witnessed baseball history at Milwaukee's County Stadium. Baltimore became the first team in the 120-odd years of major league baseball to start the season 0-14 as the Brewers won, 8-6.
 June 12, 1988: Robin Yount had 6 RBIs in a game against the Baltimore Orioles.

Season standings

Record vs. opponents

Notable transactions
 June 1, 1988: 1988 Major League Baseball draft
Pat Listach was drafted by the Brewers in the 5th round. Player signed June 28, 1988.
Mike Ignasiak was drafted by the Brewers in the 8th round.
 June 8, 1988: Ernest Riles was traded by the Brewers to the San Francisco Giants for Jeffrey Leonard.

Roster

Player stats

Batting

Starters by position
Note: Pos = Position; G = Games played; AB = At bats; H = Hits; Avg. = Batting average; HR = Home runs; RBI = Runs batted in

Other batters
Note: G = Games played; AB = At bats; H = Hits; Avg. = Batting average; HR = Home runs; RBI = Runs batted in

Pitching

Starting pitchers 
Note: G = Games pitched; IP = Innings pitched; W = Wins; L = Losses; ERA = Earned run average; SO = Strikeouts

Other pitchers 
Note: G = Games pitched; IP = Innings pitched; W = Wins; L = Losses; ERA = Earned run average; SO = Strikeouts

Relief pitchers 
Note: G = Games pitched; W = Wins; L = Losses; SV = Saves; ERA = Earned run average; SO = Strikeouts

Farm system

The Brewers' farm system consisted of six minor league affiliates in 1988. The AZL Brewers won the Arizona League championship.

Notes

References 
1988 Milwaukee Brewers team at Baseball-Reference
1988 Milwaukee Brewers team page at www.baseball-almanac.com

External links 
1988 Milwaukee Brewers Baseball Cards

Milwaukee Brewers seasons
Milwaukee Brewers season
Mil